The Korean Martyrs were the victims of religious persecution against Catholics during the 19th century in Korea. Between 8,000–10,000 Korean Christians were killed during this period. 103 Catholics were canonised  en masse in May 1984, including the first Korean Catholic priest, Andrew Kim Taegon, who was executed by sword in 1846.

In addition, Paul Yun Ji-Chung and 123 companions were declared "Venerable" on 7th February 2014, and on 16th August 2014. They were beatified by Pope Francis during the Asian Youth Day in Gwanghwamun Plaza in Seoul. They further moved  to beatify Catholics who were killed by North Korean communists during the Korean War.

Background
At the end of the eighteenth century, Korea was ruled by the Joseon Dynasty. It was a society based on Confucianism and its hierarchical, class relationships. There was a small minority of privileged scholars and nobility while the majority were commoners paying taxes, providing labor, and manning the military, all above a slave class.

Even though it was scholars who first introduced Christianity to Korea, ordinary people flocked to the new religion. The new believers called themselves Chonju Kyo Udul, literally "Friends of the Teaching of God of Heaven". The term "friends" was the only term in the Confucian understanding of relationships which implied equality.

History
During the early seventeenth century, Christian literature written in Chinese was imported from China to Korea. On one of these occasions, around 1777, Christian literature obtained from Jesuits in China led educated Korean Christians to study the faith. Although no Koreans were converted to Catholicism by these books until the last quarter of the eighteenth century, the ideas of the Catholic priests espoused in them were debated and denounced as heterodoxy as early as 1724.

When a Chinese priest managed to secretly enter the country a dozen years later, he found 4,000 Catholics, none of whom had ever seen a priest. The dynamic Catholic communities were led almost entirely by educated laypeople from the aristocracy, as they were the only ones who could read the books that were written in Hanja.

The community sent a delegation on foot to Beijing, 750 miles away, to ask the city's bishop for their own bishops and priests. Eventually, two Chinese priests were sent, but their ministry was short-lived, and another forty years passed before the Paris Foreign Mission Society began its work in Korea with the arrival of Father Maubant in 1836. Paul Chong Hasang, Augustine Yu Chin-gil and Charles Cho Shin-chol had made several visits to Beijing in order to find ways of introducing missionaries into Korea. Since the persecution of 1801, there had been no priest to care for the Catholic community. Serious dangers awaited the missionaries who dared to enter Korea. The bishops and priests who confronted this danger, as well as the laypeople who aided and sheltered them, were in constant threat of losing their lives.

Bishop Laurent Imbert and ten other French missionaries were the first Paris Foreign Missions Society priests to enter Korea and to embrace a different culture. During the daytime, they stayed in hiding, but at night they traveled about on foot attending to the spiritual needs of the faithful and administering the sacraments. The first Korean Catholic priest, Andrew Kim Taegŏn, succeeded in entering Korea as a missionary. However, thirteen months after his ordination he was put to death by the sword in 1846 at the age of 26.

The Catholics gathering in one place with no distinction on the basis of class were perceived to undermine "hierarchical Confucianism", the ideology which held the state together. The new learning was seen to be subversive of the establishment and this gave rise to systematic suppression and persecution. The suffering the believers endured is well known through official documents which detail trials and the sentences. There were four major persecutions – the last one in 1866, at which time there were only 20,000 Catholics in Korea. (Other Christian denominations did not enter Korea until sometime later). The vast majority of the martyrs were laypeople.

Recognition 
More than 10,000 martyrs died in persecutions which extended over more than one hundred years. Of all these martyrs, seventy-nine were beatified in 1925. Twenty-four others were beatified on 6 October 1968. They had died in the persecutions of 1839 (Ki-hae persecution), 1846 (Pyong-o persecution) and 1866 (Pyong-in persecution). All together, 103 martyrs were canonized by Pope John Paul II on 6 May 1984. In breaking tradition, the ceremony did not take place in Rome but Seoul. Their feast day is September 20.
 

From the last letter of Andrew Kim Taegŏn to his parish as he awaited martyrdom with a group of twenty persons:

In the early 1870s, Father Claude-Charles Dallet compiled a comprehensive history of the Catholic Church in Korea, largely from the manuscripts of martyred Bishop Antoine Daveluy. The Korean Martyrs were known for the staunchness, sincerity, and number of their converts. An English lawyer and sinologist Edward Harper Parker observed that:

Coreans [sic], unlike Chinese and Japanese, make the most staunch and devoted converts… The Annamese [Vietnamese] make better converts than either Chinese or Japanese, whose tricky character, however, they share; but they are gentler and more sympathetic; they do not possess the staunch masculinity of the Coreans.

According to Ernst Oppert,
An observation, founded upon many years' experience, may not be out of place here, and that is, that among all Asiatic nationalities there is probably none more inclined to be converted to Christianity than the Corean [sic]… He becomes a Christian from conviction, not from any mercenary motives.

Bishop and martyr Simeon François Berneux wrote,
The Corean [sic] possesses the most perfect dispositions for receiving the faith. Once convinced, he accepts and attaches himself to it, in spite of all sacrifices it may cost him.

The priest Francis Goldie stated,
Certainly few countries, if any, have to tell of such a painful apostolate, or of one which has had such success. Japan alone in later days can boast a martyrology at all to compare with that of Corea [sic] in the number of the slain, or in the heroism of those who died for Christ.

Individual martyrs

Andrew Kim Taegon, Paul Chong Hasang and 101 Companions
The Christian community first began to take shape when Yi Seung-hun started to study Christian doctrine by himself and was eventually baptized and given the name Peter in 1784. Because of their belief in the Christian God, the first Korean Christians were persecuted repeatedly, rejected by their families, and suffered a loss of their social rank. Despite persecutions, the faith continued to spread.

The Christian community in Korea was given the assistance of two Chinese priests, but their ministry was short-lived, and another forty years passed before the Paris Foreign Missions Society began its work in Korea with the arrival of Father Mauban in 1836. A delegation was selected and sent to Beijing on foot, 750 miles, in order to ask the Bishop of Beijing to send them bishops and priests.

The same appeal was made to the Pope in Rome. Serious dangers awaited the missionaries who dared to enter Korea. The bishops and priests who confronted this danger, as well as the lay Christians who aided and sheltered them, were in constant threat of losing their lives.

Until the granting of religious liberty in Korea in 1886, there was a multitude of "disciples who shed their blood, in imitation of Christ Our Lord, and who willingly submitted to death, for the salvation of the world" (Lumen Gentium, 42). Among those who died, and were later labelled as martyrs, were eleven priests and ninety-two lay people who would be canonized as saints.

Bishop Laurent Imbert and ten other French missionaries were the first Paris Foreign Mission Society priests to enter Korea and to embrace a different culture for the love of God. During the daytime, they kept in hiding, but at night they travelled about on foot attending to the spiritual needs of the faithful and administering the sacraments.

The first Korean priest, Andrew Kim Taegon, prompted by his faith in God and his love for the Christian people, found a way to make the difficult task of a missionary entry into Korea. However, just thirteen months after his ordination he was put to death by the sword when he was just 25 years old and the holy oils of ordination were still fresh on his hands.

Paul Chong Hasang, Augustine Yu Chin-gil and Charles Cho Shin-chol had made several visits to Beijing in order to find new ways of introducing missionaries into Korea. Since the persecution of 1801, there had been no priest to care for the Christian community. Finally, they succeeded in opening a new chapter in the history of the extension of the Church in Korea with the arrival of a bishop and ten priests of the Paris Foreign Missions Society.

Among the martyrs honored were fifteen virgins, including the two sisters Agnes Kim Hyo-ju and Columba Kim Hyo-im who loved Jesus with undivided heart (I Cor. 7:32–34). These women, in an era when Christian religious life was still unknown in Korea, lived in community and cared for the sick and the poor. Similarly, John Yi Kwang-hyol died a martyr's death after having lived a life of celibacy in consecrated service to the Church.

It is also important to recall in a special way some of the other martyrs who were canonized that day: Damien Nam Myong-hyok and Maria Yi Yon-hui were models of family life; John Nam Chong-sam, though of high social rank, was a model of justice, chastity and poverty; John Pak Hu-jae who, after he lost his parents in the persecutions, learned to survive by making straw sandals; Peter Kwon Tug-in who devoted himself to meditation; Anna Pak Agi who, although she did not have a deep grasp of Christian doctrine, was wholly devoted to Jesus and Mary; and finally, Peter Yu Tae-chol who at 13, bravely confessed his faith and died a martyr.

Biography of major martyrs 
Yun Ji-chung Paul (1759–1791): Yun Ji-chung Paul, the first Chosun martyr killed for his Catholic faith, was born in 1759 to a noble family in Jinsan, Jeolla-do. Yun Ji-heon Francis, who was martyred during the Shinyu Persecution of 1801, was his younger brother.

In 1783, Yun passed the first state examination and learned about Catholicism for the first time through his cousin Jung Yak Yong John. After being baptized in 1787, he preached the Catholic doctrine to his mother, younger brother, and cousin Kwon Sang Yeon James. He also kept in touch with Yoo Hang Geom Augustine to keep up mission work.

In 1791, Bishop Gouvea of Beijing ordered a ban on traditional ancestral rites within his diocese. Yun Ji Chung and Kwon Sang Yeon, in accordance with the Church's commands, set their families ancestral tablets on fire. Chung's mother died the following year. She requested to receive a Catholic funeral which her son duly provided for her. These actions angered the royal family.

News of Yun's actions led to dispute in the royal court. In the end, Jeongjo backed the Noron faction push to oppress Catholicism and ordered the arrest of Yun and Kwon.

The governor of Jinsan went to Yun's house. He discovered the absence of the family's ancestral plates. At the time the pair were in hiding. Upon hearing that Yuns's uncle had been taken into custody they handed themselves into the authorities.

In the face of calls to renounce their Catholic faith the pair refused. The governor judged that getting them to abandon their religion was beyond him. They were sent to a government building in Jeonju. The pair continued to refuse apostasy despite interrogation and torture. An official report on the situation was delivered to the royal court. Opinion within the court was in favour of the death penalty. Jeongjo supported this view and ordered their execution. On the 8th of the December 1791 Yun and Kwon were beheaded.

This episode is referred to as the 'Jinsan incident'. 
 
Fr. Jacob Zhou Wenmo (1752–1801): The first missionary priest to be dispatched to Chosun. Born in Suzhou, China in 1752, he lost his parents early in life and were raised by his grandmother. He entered Catholic by himself and became a priest as one of the first graduates at Beijing Archdiocese seminary. At that time, Bishop Gouvea in Beijing was planning to send a clergy to Chosun. He chose Father Ju, who had a strong faith and looked similar to Chosun people. After leaving Beijing in February 1794, Father Ju waited at Yodong area until the Amnokgang River froze enough to cross across. On the appointed date, he went to a town located on the border between China and Chosun to meet secret envoys sent from Chosun and entered Chosun on the night of December 24. Since then, Father Ju stayed at the house of a faithful to learn Hangul, the Korean alphabets. On Easter of 1795, he held a mass with the faithful for the first time. However, after his entry was revealed, he escaped to female President Kang Wan Sook (Colomba)'s house and continued to pray in many areas in secrecy. The number of the faithful increased to 10,000 after six years but as the Catholic Persecution of 1801 occurred and the faithful were forced to confess the location of Father Ju, he decided to surrender on March 11 of that year. On May 31, Father Ju was decapitated at Saenamteo area near Han River at the age of 49.
 
Yun Yoo Il Paul (1760–1795): A secret envoy from Beijing who helped missionary to enter Chosun. He was born in Yeoju, Kyungki-do in 1760. After moving to Yanggeun, he encountered Catholic while studying under Kwon Chul Shin. He learned Catholic doctrine from Kwon Il Shin, the younger brother of Kwon Chul Shin, and entered into Catholic. He then preached the doctrine to his family. In 1789, Yun Yoo Il was selected as a secret envoy by the church leaders to report the situation of Chosun church to Bishop Gouvea. Thus, he went to Beijing two times: in 1789 and in 1790. In 1791, Bishop Gouvea's plan to dispatch a priest failed and persecution took place in Chosun. Nonetheless, Yun Yoo Il continued to endeavor to dispatch a priest. In 1794, he finally succeeded in bringing Father Ju Mun Mo to Chosun. Since then, he was responsible for keeping in contact with Beijing church. In 1795, Yun Yoo Il was arrested along with Ji Hwang (Sabas), Choi In Gil (Mathew). They were tortured to tell the location of Father Ju, but their strong endurance and wise response rather confused the persecutors. As a result, the three of them were beaten to death on June 28 of that year, when Yun Yoo Il was 35, Ji Hwang 28, and Choi In Gil 30.
 
Jeong Yak Jong Augustinus (1760–1801): The first Catholic lay theologian in Korea. In 1760, he was born into a family of scholars in Majae (current Neungnae-ri Joan-myeon, Namyangju-si Gyeonggi-go). He is the father of Jeong Chul Sang(Charles ?-1801) who will be beatified together with the 123 Blessed and St. Jeong Ha Sang Paul (martyred in 1839), who was declared saint in 1984. After learning Catholic doctrine from his older brother Jeong Yak Jeon in 1786, he moved to Yanggeon Bunwon (current Bunwon-ri, Namjeong-myeon, Gwangju-gun, Gyeonggi-go) to live a life of faith and preached a doctrine to his neighbors while participating in church activities. After Father Ju Mun Mo came in 1794, Jeong Yak Jong often visited Han Yang to help church work. He also wrote two easy Hangul textbooks called 'Jugyo-yoji' a Catechism in the Korean language and distributed them to Christians with Father Ju's approval. Moreover, he became the first president of a layperson association called 'Myeongdo-hoe' which was organized by Father Ju. When persecution began in his hometown in 1800, Jeong Yak Jong and his family moved to Han Yang. However, Catholic Persecution of 1801 began in the following year and Jeong Yak Jong was arrested. As he tried to preach the righteousness of Catholic doctrine to persecutors, he was decapitated at Seosomun in 15 days after he was arrested. When he was martyred, he said "I'd rather die looking up at the sky than to die looking down at the ground" and was decapitated while looking up at the sky. That was 8 April 1801, when he was at age 41.
 
Kang Wan Sook Columba (1761–1801): Female leader of Chosun Catholic. In 1761, she was born to a concubine of a noble family in Naepo area in ChungCheong-do. She learned about Catholic soon after she was married and practiced doctrine by reading Catholic books. During the persecution in 1791, she was imprisoned while taking care of the imprisoned faithful. Kang Wan Sook guided her mother-in-law and her son from previous marriage (Hong Pil Joo Phillips, martyred in 1801) to enter Catholic but she could not make her husband enter Catholic. Later, when her husband got a concubine, Kang Wan Sook and her husband lived separately. After hearing that the faithful in Han Yang are well-informed with Catholic doctrine, she moved to Han Yang with her mother-in-law and her son. She provided financial support to Christians working on recruiting a clergy and was baptized by Father Ju Mun Mo. Knowing her fine personality, Father Ju appointed Kang Wan Sook as a female President to take care of the faithful. When a persecution in 1795 took place, Kang Wan Sook took advantage of the fact that persecutors cannot search a house owned by a woman and let Father Ju to take refuge in her house. Her house was also used for the faithful's assembly. On April 6, 1801, Kang Wan Sook helped Father Ju to escape while being arrested. Although persecutors tried to trace Father Ju's whereabouts through her, she refused to confess. On 2 July, she was decapitated outside Seosomun at age 40.
 
Yu Hang-geom Augustine (1756–1801): The priest of Ho Nam. Yu Hang-geum Augustine was born in 1756 in Chonam, Jeonju. He learned the catechism soon after Catholicism was introduced to Korea in 1784 and became a Catholic. His sons Yu Jung-cheol John, Yu Mun-seok John and his daughter-in-law Yi Sun-i Lutgarda and his nephew Yu Jung-seong Matthew will be beatified along with Yu Hang-geom Augustine. He showed compassion and gave alms to poor neighbors as well as to his servants. Augustine Yu was appointed as pastor of Jeolla-do region when in the spring of 1786, the leaders of the Catholics held a meeting and appointed clergy at their own discretion. Afterwards, Augustine Yu returned to his hometown and celebrated Mass and administered the Sacraments to the faithful. However, after a while, the leaders of the Catholics understood that such an act was a sacrilege. As soon as this was brought to his attention, he stopped immediately. When the Persecution of 1801 broke out, Augustine Yu, who was recognized as the head of the Church in the Jeolla-do region, was first to be arrested. He was taken to Seoul (Hanyang) from Jeon ju where he underwent interrogation and torture at the Police Headquarters. However, since he was already determined to die a martyr, he neither betrayed the other believers nor said anything that would harm the Church. The persecutors, despite all their efforts, could not get any of the information they were looking for. Hence, they charged him with the crime of treason and ordered that he be executed. With this decision, Augustine Yu was transferred back to Jeonju, where he was hacked to pieces outside the South Gate of Jeonju.
 
Hwang Il-gwang Simon (1757–1802): Hwang Il-gwang Simon was born in Hongju, Chungcheong-do to a low-class family. Around 1792, he moved to Hongsan, where he went to see Yi Jon-chang Louis Gonzaga to learn about the Catholic teaching. After he understood the faith, he left his hometown and moved to Gyeongsang-do to have more freedom to practice his religious life. The Catholics knew about the social status of Simon Hwang, but they welcomed him with open hearts and surrounded him with Christian charity. On receiving such warm treatment he stated, "Here, everybody treats me as a human being despite my low-class status. Now, I believe that Heaven exists here and hereafter." In 1800 Simon Hwang moved to the neighboring house of Jeong Yak-jong Augustine and when Augustine Jeong moved to Seoul (Hanyang), he also moved to Seoul (Hanyang) with his younger brother and made his living by selling firewood. In 1801, Simon Hwang was arrested while he was on his way to the mountain to get firewood. By stating that the Catholic religion is a 'holy religion', he was cruelly beaten to the point that one of his legs was broken. Simon Hwang was then transferred to his hometown Hong ju and was beheaded. It was on 30 January 1802 when Simon Hwang was 45 years old. 
 
Yi Sun-I Lutgarda (1782–1802): A couple who kept their virginity through faith. Yi Sun-I Lutgarda was born in 1782 to a well-known noble family. Her brothers Yi Gyeong-do Charles (martyred in 1801) and Yi Gyeong-eon Paul (martyred in 1827), and her husband Yu Jung-cheol John (martyred in 1801) will be beatified with her. Yi Yun-ha. Matthew, Lutgarda Yi's father, inherited the scholarship of his maternal grandfather Yi Ik who was a renowned scholar of the time. Matthew Yi became a Catholic in 1784, soon after Catholicism was introduced to Korea, when he met Kwon Chol-sin, and Kwon Il-sin. Lutgarda Yi received her First Holy Communion from Father Zhou Wen-mo James and made a vow of chastity. However, in the society of that time, it was extremely difficult for a young woman to remain single. When she was 15 years old, Lutgarda confessed to her mother that she had decided to keep her vow of chastity for God. Her mother agreed with her decision and consulted Father James Zhou. Father James Zhou remembered that Yu Jung-cheol John also wanted to live a life of celibacy. Hence, he immediately sent a messenger and arranged their marriage. In 1798, Lutgarda Yi went to her husband's hometown, Chonam in Jeonju and made a vow to live a celibate life. During Shinyu Persecution in 1801, Yu Hang-gom Augustine, her father-in-law, was first arrested. Lutgarda Yi was arrested later and was taken to Jeonju. Lutgarda Yi was condemned to exile and left for Hamgyeong-do. However soon the police followed them and arrested them again. On 31 January 1802, Lutgarda Yi was taken to the execution ground in Jeonju, called 'Supjeongi' and was beheaded. Lutgarda Yi was 20 years old. The letter she wrote while she was imprisoned in Jeonju still remains until today and testifies for the values of Catholics of the time.
 
Kim Jin-hu Pius (1739–1814): The ancestor of the St. Kim Taegon Andrew. Kim Jin-hu Pius was born in Solmoe, Chungcheong-do. He was the great-grandfather of St. Kim Taegon Andrew and the father of Kim Jong-han Andrew, who was martyred in 1816 and who will be beatified with the 123 Blessed. Pius Kim encountered Catholicism when his eldest son learned the catechism from Yi Jon-chang Gonzaga and taught it to his brothers. Then, Pius Kim was about 50 years old. As he obtained a small government post from the governor, he strongly refused the advice of his children. However, as his sons kept persuading him, he gradually drawn towards Jesus Christ and quitted his government position to focus on fulfilling religious duties. When Pius Kim was arrested during the Sinhae persecution in 1791, he professed his faith in God. He was arrested four to five more times but was released each time. He was also arrested during the Shinyu Persecution in 1801, but was exiled and set free. Pius Kim was arrested again in 1805 and was taken to Haemi. This time, he behaved like a real Catholic and professed his faith in God without hesitation. He stayed in prison for a long time without being sentenced to death. In prison, the officials and prison guards respected him for his noble and dignified personality and conduct. He spent 10 years in prison, during which he endured the sufferings and pains of prison. He died in prison on 1 December 1814 at the age of 75. 
 
Yi Seong-rye (1801–1840): Mother who inherited faith to her children
She was born in 1801 in Hongju, Chungcheong-do. She was from the family of Louis Gonzaga Yi Jon-chang. At the age of 17, she married St. Francis Choe Kyeong-hwan and lived in Darakgol, Hongju. In 1821 she gave birth to their first son, Thomas Choe Yang-up. Due to the danger of persecution the family had to move frequently but Yi Seong-rye told biblical stories to her children and taught them to endure difficulties and to be patient. After settling down in Surisan (currently Gunpo-city, Gyeonggi-do) she helped her husband to set up the Christian village. Meanwhile, her son Thomas Choe Yang-up was chosen to be a candidate for the seminarian and was sent to Macau to study theology. In 1839, during the Gihae persecution her husband went back and forth Hanyang (now Seoul) to take care of the bodies of the Martyrs, she supported her husband and finally was arrested by the police with her whole family in Surisan. She suffered painfully not because of the torture, but because of her maternal love for her new-born baby who was nearly starved to death due to lack of milk from his mother. Yi could no longer abandon her baby so she yielded to defy her faith and was released from prison. When her eldest son left to China to be a seminarian, she was imprisoned once again. When she was sentenced to death, with divine grace and prayers from her Catholic friends, she overcame all the temptation and was sent to Danggogae (now Wonhyoro 2-ga, Yongsan-gu, Seoul) to be beheaded at the age of 39.

Legacy
Pope John Paul II, speaking at the canonization, said, "The Korean Church is unique because it was founded entirely by lay people. This fledgling Church, so young and yet so strong in faith, withstood wave after wave of fierce persecution. Thus, in less than a century, it could boast of 10,000 martyrs. The death of these martyrs became the leaven of the Church and led to today's splendid flowering of the Church in Korea. Even today their undying spirit sustains the Christians in the Church of silence in the north of this tragically divided land". After the canonization of the 103 Martyrs, the Catholic Church in Korea felt that the martyrs who died in the other persecutions also need to be recognized. In 2003, the beatification process for 124 martyrs who died in persecutions between 1791 and 1888 began.

They were declared Venerable by Pope Francis on 7 February 2014. The group is headed by Paul Yun Ji-Chung, a nobleman who converted to Catholicism and refused to have his deceased mother buried under the traditional Confucian rite. His refusal led to a massive persecution of Christians called the Sinhae Persecution in 1791. Paul was beheaded on 8 December 1791, together with his cousin, James Kwon Sang-yeon. They were the first members of the Korean Nobility to be killed for the faith. Among the martyrs in this group are Fr. James Zhou Wen-mo (1752–1801), a Chinese priest who secretly ministered to the Christians in Korea; Augustine Jeong Yak-Jong (1760–1801), the husband of St. Cecilia Yu So-sa and father of Sts. Paul Chong Ha-sang and Elizabeth Chong Chong-hye; Columba Kang Wan-suk (1761–1801), known as the "catechist of the Korean Martyrs"; Augustine Yu Hang-geom (1756–1801), also known as the "apostle of Jeolla-do"; and Maria Yi Seong-rye (1801–1840), the wife of St. Francis Choe Kyeong-hwan. Also included in the group are Augustine Yu Hang-geom's son John Yu Jeong-cheol (1779–1801) and his wife Lutgarda Yi Sun-i (1782–1802). They both decided to live celibate lives in order to fully dedicate themselves to God, but the Confucian society, which greatly valued furthering the family line, made it impossible for them to live as celibates. Fr. James Zhou introduced the two to each other and suggested them to marry each other and live as a "virgin couple". The two were married in 1797 and were martyred 4 years later.

Korean Martyrs Museum-Shrine

The Museum-Shrine, which contains rooms for liturgical celebration and prayer, was built in 1967 on the site in Jeoldu-san, where many of the Korean martyrs died from 1866 to 1873. The Shrine-Museum presents numerous historical documents, visual reconstructions, photographs and documentaries. The Christian community suffered harsh persecutions, especially in the second half of the 1800s. In 2004 the Archdiocese of Seoul opened its investigation into the cause for beatification of the Servant of God Paul Yun Ji-Chung and his 123 companions who in 1791 were tortured and killed in odium fidei, in hatred of the faith.

Churches named after the martyrs
 Holy Korean Martyrs, San Jose,  California, US
Church of the Korean Martyrs, Nashville, Tennessee, US
 Church of the Korean Martyrs, Saddle Brook, New Jersey, US
 Korean Martyrs Catholic Church of Portland, Oregon, US
 Korean Martyrs Catholic Church of Atlanta, Georgia, US
 Korean Martyrs Catholic Church of Westminster, California, US
 Korean Martyrs Catholic Church of Chicago, Illinois, US

See also
 Christianity in Korea
 Roman Catholicism in South Korea
 Seohak
 Catholic Persecution of 1801
 Robert Jermain Thomas
 Christianization

References

Bibliography
Attwater, Donald and Catherine Rachel John (1993). The Penguin Dictionary of Saints. 3rd edition. New York: Penguin Books. .
Dallet, Charles (1874). Histoire de l'Église de Corée, Volume 1. Paris: Librairie Victor Palmé. 
Dallet, Charles (1874). Histoire de l'Église de Corée, Volume 2. Paris: Librairie Victor Palmé. 
Fathers of the London Oratory (1859). The New Glories of the Catholic Church. London: Richardson and Son.

External links
Homily of Pope John Paul II given for the Mass for the canonization of the Korean martyrs
 List and brief description of martyrs
 History of the Missions Etrangeres de Paris MEP

19th-century Roman Catholic martyrs
Martyred groups
Roman Catholic child saints
Executed Korean people
Korean Roman Catholic saints
Catholic Church in Korea
Lists of Christian martyrs
1839 deaths
Year of birth unknown
19th-century executions by Korea
Lists of saints
Groups of Roman Catholic saints
Canonizations by Pope John Paul II
Beatifications by Pope Francis
Korean beatified people
Korean martyrs